Countess Cross is a hamlet in the civil parish of Colne Engaine, near the town of Halstead in the Braintree district, in the English county of Essex.

Other nearby settlements 
Other nearby settlements include Boose's Green, Earls Colne, White Colne, Pebmarsh and Daw's Cross.

Features 
There is a wood called Little Wheatley Wood in Countess Cross.

External links

References 
A-Z Essex, 2010 edition. p. 15.

Hamlets in Essex
Braintree District